The Hui Kālaiʻāina (Hawaiian Political Association) was a political group founded in 1888 to oppose the 1887 Constitution of the Hawaiian Kingdom, often known as the Bayonet Constitution, and to promote Native Hawaiian leadership in the government. It and the two organizations of Hui Aloha ʻĀina were active in the opposition to the overthrow of the Hawaiian Kingdom and the annexation of Hawaii to the United States from 1893 to 1898.

History 
Hui Kālaiʻāina or the Hawaiian Political Association was founded on November 22, 1888 to oppose the 1887 Constitution of the Hawaiian Kingdom, often known as the Bayonet Constitution, and to promote Native Hawaiian leadership in the government. The organization elected as its first president John E. Bush, a former royal governor of Kauai and cabinet minister of King Kalākaua. American Daniel Lyons, who also later president of Hui Kālaiʻāina and was an active organizer for the group.

On the afternoon of January14, 1893, after the prorogation of the legislative session, members of Hui Kālaiʻāina and a delegation of native leaders marched to ʻIolani Palace with a sealed package containing a newly drafted constitution. At the head of the procession was John W. Alapai, head deacon of Kaumakapili Church and president of Hui Kālaiʻāina. He led the procession of members of the organization, marching two by two, with John Akina holding the sealed constitution. According to William DeWitt Alexander, this was pre-planned by the queen to take place while she met with her newly appointed cabinet ministers in the Blue Room of the palace. She was attempting to promulgate the constitution during the recess of the legislative assembly. However, these ministers, including Samuel Parker, William H. Cornwell, John F. Colburn, and Arthur P. Peterson, were either opposed to or reluctant to support the new constitution.

These actions and the radicalized political climate eventually led to the overthrow of the monarchy, on January17, 1893, by the Committee of Safety, with the covert support of United States Minister John L. Stevens and the landing of American forces from the USS Boston. After a brief transition under the Provisional Government, the oligarchical Republic of Hawaii was established on July4, 1894, with Sanford B. Dole as president. During this period, the defacto government, which was composed largely of residents of American and European ancestry, sought to annex the islands to the United States against the wishes of the Native Hawaiians who wanted to remain an independent nation ruled by the monarchy.

In anticipation of a new vote on an annexation treaty supported by President William McKinley, Hui Kālaiʻāina and other Hawaiian nationalist groups collected petitions to oppose the treaties ratification in the United States Senate in 1897. Members of Kālaiʻāina collected 17,000 signatures opposing annexation and asking for the restoration of Queen Liliʻuokalani while Hui Aloha ʻĀina collected over 21,000 signatures across the island chain opposing annexation. The petitions were presented by a commission of Native Hawaiian delegates consisting of James Keauiluna Kaulia, (president of Hui Aloha ʻĀina), David Kalauokalani (president of Hui Kālaiʻāina), William Auld, and John Richardson to the United States government. It was decided last minute not to submit the signatures by Hui Kālaiʻāina because it asked for the restoration of the monarchy and the delegations wanted to provide a united message to the United States and did not want to be seen as politically divided. Instead, Kalauokalani endorsed the signatures by Hui Aloha ʻĀina to provide a stronger message. The petitions collectively were presented as evidence of the strong grassroots opposition of the Hawaiian community to annexation, and the treaty was defeated in the Senate.

However, a year following the defeat of the treaty in the Senate, Hawaii was annexed via the Newlands Resolution, a joint resolution of Congress, in July 1898. This was done shortly after the outbreak of the Spanish–American War and necessitated by the strategic position of Hawaii as a Pacific military base.

To no avail, Hui Kālaiʻāina continued to attempt to undo the annexation of Hawaii to the United States and restore a Native Hawaiian-led government.

The organization participated in the funeral processions of Princess Kaʻiulani and Queen Kapiʻolani in 1899 and was referred to as Ahahui Kalaiaina in the published funerary procession in the local newspapers.

Dissolution and legacy 
The organization merged with Hui Aloha ʻĀina to form the Hawaiian Home Rule Party in 1900. Kalauokalani was elected president and Kaulia as vice-president of the new political party.

In 1996, historian Noenoe K. Silva discovered the 21,269 signatures of the Kūʻē Petitions by Hui Aloha ʻĀina in the National Archives in Washington, DC, but the whereabout of the original Hui Kālaiʻāina petition remains unknown.

See also 
Opposition to the overthrow of the Hawaiian Kingdom

References

Bibliography 

Hawaiian Kingdom
Hawaiiana
Hawaii culture
1888 establishments
1900 disestablishments
Native Hawaiian nationalist parties